Vinton is a ghost town in Valley County, Nebraska, in the United States.

History
A post office was established at Vinton in 1875, and remained in operation until it was discontinued in 1888.

References

Geography of Valley County, Nebraska